Ackley Geneva Wellsburg Steamboat Rock (AGWSR) Community School District is a rural public school district headquartered in Ackley, Iowa.

It occupies sections of Butler, Franklin, Grundy, and Hardin counties. It serves Ackley, Geneva, Steamboat Rock, and Wellsburg.

The district formed on July 1, 2001, with the merger of the Wellsburg-Steamboat Rock Community School District and the Ackley–Geneva Community School District.

Schools
 AGWSR High School (Ackley)
 AGWSR Elementary School at Wellsburg (Wellsburg)
 AGWSR Elementary School (Ackley)
 AGWSR Middle School (Wellsburg)
 The Cougars Den (Ackley)

AGWSR High School

Athletics
The Cougars compete in the North Iowa Cedar League Conference in the following sports:

Bowling
Cross Country (boys and girls)
Volleyball (girls)
Football (boys)
Basketball (boys and girls)
Girls' 2009 Class 1A State Champions
Wrestling (boys and girls)
Track and Field (boys and girls)
Golf (boys and girls)
Baseball (boys)
Softball (girls)
 2015 Class 1A State Champions
Soccer (boys and girls)
Tennis (boys and girls)

Enrollment

See also
List of school districts in Iowa
List of high schools in Iowa

References

External links
 AGWSR Schools

School districts in Iowa
Education in Butler County, Iowa
Education in Franklin County, Iowa
Education in Grundy County, Iowa
Education in Hardin County, Iowa
2001 establishments in Iowa
School districts established in 2001